Meloe carbonaceus is a species of blister beetles in the family Meloidae. It is found in North America.

References

 Pinto, John D., and Richard B. Selander (1970). "The Bionomics of Blister Beetles of the Genus Meloe and a Classification of the New World Species". Illinois Biological Monographs, no. 42, 222.

Further reading

 Arnett, R.H. Jr., M. C. Thomas, P. E. Skelley and J. H. Frank. (eds.). (2002). American Beetles, Volume II: Polyphaga: Scarabaeoidea through Curculionoidea. CRC Press LLC, Boca Raton, FL.
 Arnett, Ross H. (2000). American Insects: A Handbook of the Insects of America North of Mexico. CRC Press.
 Richard E. White. (1983). Peterson Field Guides: Beetles. Houghton Mifflin Company.

Meloidae
Beetles described in 1866